Homosynaptic plasticity is one type of synaptic plasticity. Homosynaptic plasticity is input-specific, meaning changes in synapse strength occur only at post-synaptic targets specifically stimulated by a pre-synaptic target. Therefore, the spread of the signal from the pre-synaptic cell is localized.  Another type of synaptic plasticity, heterosynaptic plasticity, is not input-specific and differs from homosynaptic plasticity in many mechanisms.

In addition to being input-specific, the strengthening of a synapse via homosynaptic plasticity is associative, because it is dependent on the firing of a presynaptic and postsynaptic neuron closely in time. This associativity increases the chances that the postsynaptic neuron will also fire. These mechanisms are theorized to underlie learning and short-term memory.

Overview

Hebb's postulate
Donald Hebb theorized that strengthening of synaptic connections occurred because of coordinated activity between the pre-synaptic terminal and post-synaptic dendrite. According to Hebb, these two cells are strengthened because their signaling occurs together in space and/or time, also known as coincident activity. This postulate is often summarized as Cells that fire together, wire together, which means that the synapses that have neurons with coincident firing are strengthened, while the other synapses on these neurons remain unchanged. Hebb's postulate has provided a conceptual framework for how synaptic plasticity underlies long-term information storage.

Mechanisms for input-specificity
Changes in plasticity often occurs via the insertion or internalization of AMPA receptors (AMPARs) into the postsynaptic membrane of the synapse undergoing a change in connective strength. Ca2+ is one signaling ion that causes this AMPA receptor density change by inducing a cascade of biological changes within the cell. To induce long-term potentiation (LTP), Ca2+ activates CAMKII and PKC, causing phosphorylation and insertion of AMPARs, while long-term depression (LTD) occurs by Ca2+ activating protein phosphatases, which dephosphorylate and cause internalization of AMPARs.

In order to create input-specific changes in synaptic strength, the Ca2+ signal must be restricted to specific dendritic spines. Dendritic restriction of Ca2+ is mediated by several mechanisms. Extracellular Ca2+ can enter the spine through NMDA receptors (NMDARs) and voltage gated Ca2+ channels (VGCCs). Both NMDARs and VGCCs are concentrated on dendritic spines, mediating spine specific Ca2+ influx. Intracellular stores of Ca2+ in the endoplasmic reticulum and mitochondria may also contribute to spine restricted signaling, although some studies have failed to find evidence for this. Clearance of Ca2+ is controlled by buffer proteins, which bind to Ca2+ and keep it from trickling out to other spines. Restricted diffusion of Ca2+ across the neck of the dendritic spine also helps isolate it to specific dendrites.

Another mechanism for input-specific long-term potentiation is temporal. NMDARs require both depolarization, to remove their magnesium block, and glutamate activation, to open their channels, to allow Ca2+ influx. LTP is thus localized at sites where NMDA channels are opened by active synaptic inputs that are releasing glutamate and causing depolarization of the postsynaptic cell, and will not affect nearby inactive synapses.

Maintaining Long-Term Changes
In order to stabilize LTP and make it last longer periods of time, new proteins supporting this change are synthesized in response to stimulation at a potentiating synapse. The challenge that arises is how to get specific, newly synthesized proteins to the correct input-specific synapses they are need at. Two solutions to this problem include synaptic tagging and local protein synthesis.

Synaptic Tagging

Synaptic tags mark where synaptic plasticity has occurred and can thus provide information on synaptic strength and potential for long-term plastic changes. The tag is temporary and involves a large number of proteins, activated by the influx of Ca2+ into the postsynaptic cell. In addition, depending on the type and magnitude of synaptic change, different proteins are used for tagging. For example, when plastic changes lead to long-term depression, calcineurin is used. Conversely, when plasticity leads to long-term potentiation, CaMKII is used. In order for synaptic plasticity to be input-specific, these synaptic tags are essential on post-synaptic targets, to ensure synaptic potentiation is localized. These tags will later initiate protein synthesis that will in turn cause synaptic plasticity changes at these activated neurons.

Local Protein Synthesis
Protein synthesis at dendrites is necessary for homosynaptic plasticity. The depolarization and resulting activation of AMPA and NMDA receptors in the postsynaptic cell causes endocytosis of these receptors. Local protein synthesis is required to maintain the number of surface receptors at the synapse. These new proteins help stabilize the structural changes induced by homosynaptic plasticity. There is evidence of ribosomes in dendrites, which can manufacture these proteins. Furthermore, there is also evidence of granules of RNA in dendrites, which indicates the presence of newly made proteins. LTP can be induced from dendrites severed from the soma of the post-synaptic target neuron. Contrarily, LTP can be blocked in these dendrites by protein synthesis blockers, such as Endomyacin, which further indicates a site for local protein synthesis. This evidence shows local protein synthesis is necessary for L-LTP to be stabilized and maintained.

References

Memory